The winners of the 2005 Internet Movie/Television Awards, given by the Internet Entertainment Writers Association are listed below.

Movie Awards
Internet Movie Awards 2005
2005

Best Picture:
 Brokeback Mountain
The winners of the Internet Movie Awards:

Favorite Actor in a Leading Role: 
Heath Ledger - Brokeback Mountain
Favorite Actor in a Supporting Role: 
Jake Gyllenhaal - Brokeback Mountain
Favorite Actress in a Leading Role: 
Reese Witherspoon - Walk the Line
Favorite Actress in a Supporting Role: 
Michelle Williams - Brokeback Mountain
Favorite Director: 
Ang Lee - Brokeback Mountain
Favorite Picture: 
Brokeback Mountain
Favorite Screenplay: 
Brokeback Mountain - Larry McMurtry and Diana Ossana
Favorite Song: 
"A Love That Will Never Grow Old"  - Brokeback Mountain
Favorite Soundtrack or Musical Score: 
Brokeback Mountain
Favorite Visual Effects: 
King Kong
Breakthrough Performance: 
Michelle Williams - Brokeback Mountain
Worst Picture: 
The Dukes of Hazzard

Television Awards
The winners of the Internet Television Awards:

Favorite Primetime Comedy Series: 
Family Guy
Favorite Primetime Drama Series: 
24
Favorite Primetime Non-scripted Reality or Game Series: 
The Amazing Race 
Favorite Late Night Variety Programming (tie): 
The Daily Show with Jon Stewart
Late Night with Conan O'Brien
Favorite Actor in a Primetime Comedy Series: 
Zach Braff - Scrubs
Favorite Actor in a Primetime Drama Series: 
Kiefer Sutherland - 24
Favorite Actress in a Primetime Comedy Series: 
Megan Mullally - Will & Grace
Favorite Actress in a Primetime Drama Series: 
Evangeline Lilly - Lost
Favorite Actress in a Primetime Drama Series: 
Amber Tamblyn - Joan of Arcadia

 

2005 film awards
2005 television awards